Dog Ear Lake is a natural lake in South Dakota, in the United States.

Dog Ear Lake has the name of an Indian chief who settled there.

See also
List of lakes in South Dakota

References

Lakes of South Dakota
Bodies of water of Tripp County, South Dakota